Miguel de Ambiela (1666 – 29 March 1733) was a Spanish composer.

He was born at La Puebla de Albortón, and became maestro de capilla at the Basilica of Our Lady of the Pillar, Saragossa. He was a composer employing conservative traditional polyphony. Some of his works are preserved in Latin American manuscripts.  He died in Toledo, Spain, in his fifties.

Works, editions, recordings

References

Spanish composers
Spanish male composers
1666 births
1733 deaths